Lieutenant-General George Noble Molesworth,  idc (1890–1968) was an officer commissioned into the British Army serving in India and saw active service in the Third Anglo-Afghan War. He later transferred to the British Indian Army and rose to oversee intelligence and to be Deputy Chief of General Staff of Army Headquarters India. He also served as Military Secretary to the India Office.

Military career
George Noble Molesworth was born on 14 July 1890, the eldest son of Henry B. Molesworth and grandson of Sir Guilford Molesworth. He was educated at Bradfield College and the Royal Military College, Sandhurst.

Molesworth was commissioned into the Somerset Light Infantry as a second lieutenant in March 1910. After this time he served in Malta, North China and India. He served during the First World War in India with his battalion, and served as Adjutant of the 2nd battalion from 1916 to 1919. He saw action during the Third Anglo-Afghan War, where he was Mentioned in Despatches.  He also served as Deputy Assistant Adjutant General at Army Headquarters India during 1919 and 1921 and in 1924, and was made Brigade Major in 1925. Between the years 1926 and 1927 he served as Deputy Assistant Quartermaster General at Army Headquarters India.

After attending the Staff College, Quetta from 1921 to 1922, in 1927 he transferred to the Indian Army and the 1st battalion 15th Punjab Regiment. He served as instructor at the Staff College, Quetta, from 1929 to 1933. He was promoted to Brevet Lieutenant-Colonel in 1932. Two years later, in 1934, was appointed to commanded the 4th battalion, 15th Punjab Regiment; he also attended the Imperial Defence College in 1935.

From October 1936 to September 1938 he served as Deputy Director of Military Operations and Intelligence at Army Headquarters India before being promoted to Director of Military Operations and Intelligence in September 1938. He served in this position until May 1940 before becoming Deputy Chief of General Staff at Army Headquarters India, a role he held until April 1943.
From July 1943 to December 1944 he served as Military Secretary to the India Office; he retired in February 1945.

He was Colonel of the 4th battalion, 15th Punjab Regiment from 1941 to 1960.

Family
In 1927 he married Marjorie Frances Simpson.

Honors 

Made CSI 1941
Made OBE 1950
Made CBE 1958
Honorary Colonel 12/Punjab Regiment 1961

Source: Who Was Who (UK)

References

Bibliography

External links

Publications
 *
Generals of World War II

 

1890 births
1968 deaths
Academics of the Staff College, Quetta
British Indian Army generals
Graduates of the Royal College of Defence Studies
British Army personnel of World War I
British military personnel of the Third Anglo-Afghan War
Commanders of the Order of the British Empire
Companions of the Order of the Star of India
Graduates of the Royal Military College, Sandhurst
Graduates of the Staff College, Quetta
Indian Army generals of World War II
People educated at Bradfield College
Somerset Light Infantry officers